Half-Life VR but the AI Is Self-Aware (often abbreviated as HLVR:AI) is a role-playing themed livestream and machinima series staged within a virtual reality version Garry's Mod recreation of the video game Half-Life. The series, live streamed to Twitch with highlights later uploaded to YouTube, follows Gordon Freeman accompanied by the Science Team (controlled by other improv actors) as they traverse (loosely) the events of the original Half-Life game.

The series was met with positive reception by critics. On May 12, 2020, a cast commentary series began to be uploaded to the WayneRadioTV YouTube channel. On May 31, 2020, a sequel, AI Crushes All Banks was streamed as part of a charity drive, set in Payday 2, in which the main cast begins a bank robbing spree across the city of Washington, D.C. On November 25, 2021, a spin-off series titled Half-Life: Alyx but the Gnome Is Too Aware was released.

Format 
Half-Life VR but the AI Is Self-Aware loosely follows the events of the original Half-Life, albeit with a much more humorous and comedic tone, with main character Gordon Freeman (played by series host WayneRadioTV) accidentally causing a Resonance Cascade and exploring Black Mesa to try to escape (and later undo his actions). The series' main divergence from that of the original is the introduction of original self-aware AI characters, who despite the name of the series, are performed by other improv actors.

Similarly, the series is actually played within the game Garry's Mod, as Half-Life lacks support for virtual reality and additional features necessary for the staging of the series (such as limitations with object spawning and map sizes). The most notable actor-controlled characters are the series' supporting cast: three scientists named Bubby, Dr. Coomer, and Tommy, as well as an antagonistic security guard named Benrey (alternatively spelled "Benry"), all four of whom follow Gordon in his journey through Black Mesa, generally to Gordon's detriment.

Characters

Main characters 
 Dr. Gordon Freeman (played by WayneRadioTV): The primary protagonist of the series. A scientist at Black Mesa, Gordon is the straight man of the series, reacting with confusion and horror to the rest of the cast's actions. While generally having profound perseverance and emotional stability throughout the series, he is also shown to break down after major events and often loses his patience with members of the group. Gordon is a natural leader and looks out for everyone on the team, and is hesitant to take innocent lives, unlike the other scientists. He has his hand cut off by soldiers midway through the series; one of Darnold's potions results in Gordon growing a gun-like appendage that fires fingernails in its place.  However, he later regains his missing hand at the end of the series.
 Dr. Harold Pontiff Coomer (played by hollow_tones): A scientist known for his cheerful demeanor, superhuman strength, and severely glitched tutorial NPC behavior. He is an incredibly skilled hand to hand combatant, and started the Black Mesa Underground Fight Club. Unlike the other members of the cast who generally treat the events of the series as if they were real, Dr. Coomer regularly breaks the fourth wall to inform Gordon about various made-up game mechanics. While Coomer at first appears unaware of these "glitches", the gag culminates with Coomer falling into an existential dread, realizing and making explicit references to the fact that he is in a video game. He speaks directly to Gordon at the end of the "game", suggesting that he takes the Science Team with him. His most memorable quote is "Hello, Gordon!". He speaks a lot about Wikipedia.
 Dr. Tommy Coolatta (played by Baaulp): A friendly, childlike scientist who turns 37 at the end of the series. He shows great concern for following rules and consulting written references for information, often referencing Wikipedia and OSHA regulations as they explore the ruined science facility. Tommy forms a close bond with Gordon over the course of the series, as the only member of the Science Team who never antagonizes or betrays him. However, despite his kind nature, he is highly distractible and easily manipulated by the other characters into allowing their wrongdoing. Tommy has the ability to read the Black Mesa Sweet Voice, an ability used by several characters throughout the series, especially his dog Sunkist. Tommy also has the ability to see incredibly fast due to his constant consumption of soda.
 Dr. Bubby (played by MasterGir): A crass, impulsive, and egotistical scientist. His ego and demeanor often lead him to clash with Gordon, and later in the series, Bubby betrays him to the military when Benrey convinces him that Gordon was holding them back from escaping Black Mesa. It is ambiguous as to whether Bubby is his real name – though it is listed on his passport later in the series, he claimed to have sustained a head injury from the resonance cascade that made his name hard to remember, and Gordon expresses doubt that he is remembering correctly.
 Benrey, alternatively "Benry", (played by socpens): A sullen and hostile security guard. Prior to becoming the main antagonist in the final act of the series, Benrey follows along with the Science Team while constantly harassing and arguing with Gordon, demanding to see his passport and accusing him of various misdeeds while deliberately ignoring the wrongdoings of the other characters. He has an absentminded demeanor, often ignoring the team and asking for simple directions or questions to be repeated. He exhibits near invincibility, murders indiscriminately, and casually remarks that he is "not human". Benrey was thought to have died after he was crushed by a closing door, but it was later revealed that he was still alive and had some connection to the skeletons that Gordon kept seeing. In the finale, Benrey reveals his alien nature and turns against the Science Team, blaming Gordon for the events of the Black Mesa incident and for ruining his plans to relax and play Heavenly Sword on the PlayStation 3 with his friends because he ran out of PlayStation Plus. Benrey also edits the Wikipedia Article for All Dogs Go to Heaven 2 to say that Gordon Freeman died at the end. Since then, there has been continuous vandalism of the All Dogs Go to Heaven 2 Wikipedia page, warranting semi-protection.

Recurring characters 
 G-Man (played by spaghoner): An enigmatic alien being that frequently attempts to give Gordon cryptic advice. He is later revealed to be Tommy's father, having aided Gordon so Benrey would be defeated and Tommy and his friends could have a birthday party at Chuck E. Cheese.
 Forzen (played by socpens): An HECU Marine and minor antagonist. Forzen claims to have formerly been Benrey's best friend, and the two have similar personalities and mannerisms. Despite his tough appearance, he is quite shy and does not seem particularly interested in going out of his way to cause violence. He holds Tommy's dog Sunkist (named after the eponymous soft drink) hostage, but flees when the outcome disfavors his intentions.
 Skeleton (played by socpens, spaghoner, Lauren, and Logmore): A mysterious skeleton that haunts Gordon. It is initially left ambiguous as to whether the Skeleton is a hallucination or not, and much of the nature of the skeleton is left unclear, although it is associated with Benrey in some way and often behaves like him. A team of skeletons are summoned under Benrey's control in the final battle of the series.
 Darnold (played by Logmore): The head of the Black Mesa Mixology Department. Darnold aides the Science Team by equipping them with advanced technology and administering a potion that transforms Gordon's severed arm into a minigun. While initially excited about joining the Science Team on their escape mission, he turns back after witnessing the violence they commit. He returns in AI Crushes All Banks to support the team remotely.
 Sunkist (played by Lauren): Purported to be the perfect dog. He was created by Tommy, possibly with some help from G-Man, and is immortal. Sunkist is a very large, two-dimensional stock image of a Golden Retriever, almost the same height as Gordon. He is shown to be incredibly obedient, bulletproof, and is capable of flight.
Dr Coomer's ex-wife: Dr Coomer's ex-wife is mentioned multiple times. When the science team tries to name the Vortigaunts, Dr. Coomer says they look like his ex-wife. When asked if Dr. Coomer has any family, he responds with "I did have a wife, but they took her in the divorce". It is implied he has multiple ex-wives.
JohnWicklover1994: A mysterious person who joined the Science Team temporarily during the AI Crushes All Banks stream. Portrayed as a gamer whose server was invaded with the team members. Has an apathetic and negative personality strikingly similar to Benrey's. Benrey later claims that JohnWicklover1994 was his brother using his account.

Reception 
Half-Life VR but the AI Is Self-Aware was well received by reviewers. Emily Rose of Ars Technica drew comparisons to the works of William Shakespeare and improvisational theater in general, saying "...the convergence of performer and digital performance has come full circle. Perhaps the culmination of the trend is [Half-Life VR but the AI Is Self-Aware]." Kotaku Zack Zwiezen stated it was "as good as [Freeman's Mind and G-Man Squad]", two other well-known Half-Life series, calling it "a funny and oddly compelling show". Quint Iverson of The Pacific Index stated that "the frequency at which 'Half-Life VR but the AI is Self-Aware' turns me into a laughing mess is unparalleled".

Notes

References

External links 

 
 
 Half-Life VR but the AI Is Self-Aware on Fanlore
 

2020s YouTube series
Half-Life (series)
Improvisational theatre
Livestreams
Role-playing
Twitch (service)